Kukës is a city in the Republic of Albania. The city is the capital of the surrounding municipality of Kukës and county of Kukës, one of 12 constituent counties of the republic. It spans  and had a total population of 16,719 people as of 2011. 

Geologically, the terrain of the surrounding area is dominated by mountainous and high terrain. The city sprawls across the Luma Plain within the Albanian Alps between the banks of Lake Fierza and the hills of the northernmost Korab Mountains and westernmost Shar Mountains. At the confluence of the Black and White Drin, the Drin River originates close to the city's territory.

History

Early development 
Kukës traces its history back over a thousand years. The region that nowadays corresponds to the city territory was inhabited by several ancient Illyrian tribes, as most of Albania. Numerous tombs from the Illyrians have been identified at Këneta and Kolsh nearby the city. The residential estate served as a stopping point on a branch road leading to the Via Egnatia, which connected Durrës on the Adriatic Sea in the west with Constantinople on the Marmara Sea in the east. 

Illyrian tombs were found at Këneta and Kolsh nearby Kukës. It was a small Roman settlement, a stopping point on a branch road leading to the Via Egnatia, and a minor Ottoman market centre and trading post on the road to southern Kosovo. It was there (Qafa e Kolosjanit) where Albanian resistance stood up against retreating Serbian army in 1912.

Modern development 

The old Kukës was located at the confluence of the White Drin and Black Drin. In 1976 the town was submerged beneath the Fierza Reservoir, which is held back by a dam.
The new town (Kukësi i Ri - "New Kukës") was built in the 1970s in the plateau nearby which is 320m over the sea level. Kukësi i Ri is surrounded by the artificial lake of Fierza and it looks like a peninsula from the above.
It is linked with the other parts of the country by three bridges. On the east it faces the snow-covered mountain of Gjallica, 2468 m above sea level.
In modern times and due to the close proximity to Kosovo, the city achieved worldwide recognition during the Kosovo War as thousands of Kosovo-Albanian refugees crossed the border and found security in the city.
Kukës attracted international attention during the Kosovo conflict when 450,000 Kosovo Albanian refugees crossed the frontier and were housed in camps in and around Kukës.

Contemporary 
The city was nominated for the Nobel Peace Prize in regard to hospitality and for embracing thousands of refugees during the Kosovo War. It was the first time a town was nominated for the prize. In 2017, the city applied for the 2018 European Green Capital Award to become Europe's Green Capital.
There is a mosque and a closed alpine-style hotel, part of an attempt to establish a tourist industry there. OSCE maintained a villa there.

Environment 

Kukës is situated in the northeast of the country. It lies mostly between latitudes 42° and 5° N, and longitudes 20° and 25° E. The city extend strategically within the Albanian Alps and is trapped on four sides by numerous two-thousanders including Gjallica in the south, Koritnik in the east, Pashtrik in the northeast and several mountains in the west. It lies on the Luma Plain and the southern shores of Lake Fierza.

Climate 
Like all East Albanians who are in the plain the zone is humid subtropical (Köppen: Cfa), similar to the north of Italy, due to its interior location but near the Mediterranean. Despite its southern location, its distance to the east compensates for this difference. The climate of the city is profoundly impacted by the Albanian Alps in the northeast, Shar Mountains in the east, Korab Mountains in the southeast and the Drin River in the south. The city experiences mostly continental climate. This means that the winters are very cold and snowy and the summers are predominantly hot. The city's temperature varies a large deal across the seasons with a mild spring in April and May, hot summer months from June to August, frequently rainy and windy autumn months in September and October and very cold winter months, often with snow and frost, from December to March.

Politics
The Kukës municipality was formed in 2015 by the merger of the former municipalities Arrën, Bicaj, Bushtricë, Grykë-Çajë, Kalis, Kolsh, Kukës, Malzi, Shishtavec, Shtiqën, Surroj, Tërthore, Topojan, Ujmisht and Zapod, that became municipal units. The municipality spans  and had a total population of 47,985 people as of 2011.

Economy  

Kukës County is Albania's poorest region both historically and presently. Since the 1990s many of its inhabitants have migrated to Tirana or abroad, leaving to a decline in the local economy and making Kukës among Albania's and Europe's poorest regions and least developed.

There is also a local historical museum and a carpet factory.

The food industry is confined only to the production of alcoholic drinks produced in a drink factory, and to some local small workshops producing drinks and dairy products.

The Highlanders in the region are well known for their developed agriculture. Kukës has a carpet factory whose products are for domestic and trade use. There is also a copper processing factory as the raw material, copper is found in this place.

Kukës is a good centre for fishing and walking in the surrounding mountains.

Kukës has an Kukes International Airport of its own. It is located approximately about 3.5 km (2.2 mi) south of Kukës city centre. The government of Albania granted permission for it to host international passenger traffic in 2016. Companies like Air Albania and Wizz Air operate services to Kukes, with direct flights from some European cities. On April 18th, 2021, the grand opening ceremony was held at the airport, with Air Albania Flight 9003 arriving from London. 

The A1 highway passes through Kukës.

Sister cities
  Shëngjin, Albania
   Prizren, Kosovo
  Lyndhurst, United States

See also
 List of mayors of Kukës

Notes

References 

 
 
Municipalities in Kukës County
Administrative units of Kukës
Towns in Albania
Gegëri